Bnei Brak or Bene Beraq is a city located on the central Mediterranean coastal plain in Israel, just east of Tel Aviv. It is one of the poorest and most densely populated cities in Israel, and the 5th-most densely populated city in the world.

History

Bnei Brak takes its name from the ancient Biblical city of Beneberak, mentioned in the Tanakh (Joshua 19:45) in a long list of towns within the allotment of the tribe of Dan. Bnei Brak was founded as an agricultural village by eight Polish Hasidic families who had come to Palestine as part of the Fourth Aliyah. Yitzchok Gerstenkorn led them. It was founded about 4 kilometers (2.5 miles) from the site of Biblical Beneberak. Bnei Brak was originally a moshava, and the primary economic activity was the cultivation of citrus fruits. Due to a lack of land, many of the founders turned to other occupations, and the village began to develop an urban character. Arye Mordechai Rabinowicz, formerly rabbi of Kurów in Poland, was the first rabbi. He was succeeded by Yosef Kalisz, a scion of the Vurker dynasty. The town was set up as a religious settlement from the outset, as is evident from this description of the pioneers: "Their souls were revived by the fact that they merited what their predecessors had not. What particularly revived their weary souls in the mornings and toward evening, when they would gather in the beth midrash (Jewish study hall) situated in a special shack which was built immediately upon the arrival of the very first settlers, for tefilla betzibbur (communal prayer) three times a day, for the Daf Yomi shiur (Torah lesson) and a Gemara shiur and an additional one in Mishnayos and the Shulchan Aruch."

In 1928, the Great Synagogue was completed, and the village committee celebrated its inauguration by presenting statistics noting its development over the past four years. Bnei Brak, with a population of about 800 residents, covered about 2,000 dunams, including about 800 dunams which were citrus groves. It had 116 houses, 31 huts, six public buildings, and 48 cowsheds. In the summer of 1929, Bnei Brak was connected to the electricity grid.  In the 1931 census of Palestine, the population of Benei Beraq was 956, all Jewish, in 255 houses. In 1940, it had 4,500 residents and 25 factories. In 1948, the population was 9,300. Bnei Brak achieved city status in 1950.

In April 2020, the entire city of Bnei Brak was placed under quarantine due to the coronavirus outbreak. In 2022, a Palestinian man killed five people in a mass shooting.

Rabbinic presence
Avrohom Yeshaya Karelitz (the Chazon Ish) emigrated from Belarus to Bnei Brak in its early days, and attracted a large following there. Leading rabbis who have lived in Bnei Brak include Yaakov Landau, Eliyahu Eliezer Dessler, Yaakov Yisrael Kanievsky ("the Steipler"), Yosef Shlomo Kahaneman (Ponevezher Rov), Elazar Menachem Mann Shach, Michel Yehuda Lefkowitz, Aharon Yehuda Leib Shteinman, Nissim Karelitz, Shmuel Wosner and Chaim Kanievsky. In the early 1950s, the Vizhnitzer Rebbe, Chaim Meir Hager, founded a large neighborhood in Bnei Brak which continued to serve as a dynastic center under his son, Moshe Yehoshua Hager, and under his grandsons, Yisrael Hager and Menachem Mendel Hager.

Beginning in the 1960s, the rebbes of the Ukrainian Ruzhin dynasty (Sadigura, Husiatyn and Bohush) who had formerly lived in Tel Aviv, moved to Bnei Brak. In the 1990s, they were followed by the rebbe of Modzhitz. Unlike the former four Gerrer rebbes, who lived in Jerusalem, the current rebbe was a Bnei Brak resident until 2012. The rebbes of Alexander, Biala-Bnei-Brak, Koidenov, Machnovke, Nadvorne, Premishlan, Radzin, Shomer Emunim, Slonim-Schwarze, Strykov, Tchernobil, Trisk-Bnei-Brak and Zutshke also reside in Bnei Brak. Moshe Yehuda Leib Landau was the Rabbi of Bnei Brak until his death on March 30, 2019. He was a respected authority on halakha (Jewish law) and kashrut (kosher supervision). The "Rav Landau" hechsher (kosher certification) is widely accepted. Nissim Karelitz, chief rabbi (av beis din) of the Lithuanian Haredi community, heads a beth din (rabbinical court) of Lithuanian and Hasidic dayanim, called She'eris Yisroel.

Demographics
According to figures by the municipality of Bnei Brak, the city has a population of over 181,000 residents, the majority of whom are Haredi Jews. In the 2021 Israeli legislative election, 89% of the voters chose Haredi parties. Pardes Katz, a neighborhood of about 30,000 inhabitants in northern Bnei Brak, is the sole neighborhood of the city where the majority of residents are not Haredi. In 2022, Bnei Brak was ranked Israel's most densely-populated city, with 28,000 people per square kilometer.

Mayors

Yitzchok Gerstenkorn: 1939–1954
Moshe Begno: 1954
Reuven Aharonovich: 1954–1957, 1959-1966
Shimon Soroka: 1968-1969
Yitzchok Meir: 1974-1976
Shmuel Weinberg: 1966–1968, 1978-1983
Moshe Irenstein: 1983–1990, 1993-1995
Yerachmiel Boyer: 1991-1993
Mordechai Karelitz: 1998-2003
Yissochor Frankenthal: 2003-2008
Ya'akov Asher: 2008-2013
Hanoch Zeibert: 2013-2018
Avraham Rubinstein:  2018–present

Economy

One of the landmarks of Bnei Brak is the Coca-Cola bottling plant in Kahaneman St. It is owned by the Central Bottling Company (CBC), which has held the Israeli franchise for Coca-Cola products since 1968. It is among Coca-Cola's ten largest single-plant bottling facilities worldwide.

Two major factories which dominated the centre of Bnei Brak for many years were the Dubek cigarette factory and the Osem food factory. As the town grew they found themselves in the middle of a residential area, and both companies subsequently left the area. Osem's main factory is now located on Jabotinsky road in Petah Tikva, just next to Bnei Brak.

In 2011 construction started on a business district, which will include 15 office towers. Several of the towers of the Bnei Brak Business Center are already built , and other buildings won't be completed until after 2021.

Healthcare
Bnei Brak is home to Mayanei Hayeshua Medical Center (MHMC), a Haredi hospital. It is located on the east side of the city, on the outskirts of the Ramat Aharon and Or Haim neighborhoods. It serves the residents of Bnei Brak, along with nearby Giv'at Shmuel, Petah Tikva and Ramat Gan. Founded in 1990, MHMC's initially focus was maternity, and now it is a general care facility. It consists of 18 medical departments and 32 outpatient clinics, including 12 dialysis units, a high-risk pregnancy ward and a neonatal intensive care unit. With a 320-bed capacity, MHMC handles 13,000 births, and carries out more than 6,000 surgical procedures per annum. It features a six-story Mental Health Center, which sponsors an eating-disorder clinic.

MHMC's affairs are managed in strict accordance with halakha. It has been managed by three distinct groups: A board of directors, an association of rabbis and public servants, and most influential of all, the "Halakhic Supervision Committee", a rabbinical committee consisting of Shmuel Wosner, Nissim Karelitz and Yitzchok Zilberstein, with Yisrael Rand, a confidant of Aharon Yehuda Leib Shteinman, serving as its secretary. Chaim Kanievsky was on its board of directors, as was Moshe Lion. If during any medical procedure there might arise some halakhic doubt, the medical staff will activate the halakhic team, which is headed by the hospital's rabbi. Only after the halakhic ruling is issued can the medical activity be carried out. MHMC has its own beth midrash on the premises.

Culture and lifestyle

Until the 1970s, the Bnei Brak municipality was headed by religious Zionist mayors. After Mayor Gottlieb of the National Religious Party was defeated, Haredi parties grew in status and influence; since then they have governed the city. As the Haredi population grew, the demand for public religious observance increased and more residents requested the closure of their neighbourhoods to vehicular traffic on Shabbat. In a short period of time most of Bnei Brak's secular and Religious Zionist residents migrated elsewhere, and the city has become almost homogeneously Haredi. The city has one secular neighborhood, Pardes Katz. Some names of streets with a Zionist connotation were renamed for prominent Haredi figures, such as Herzl Street south of Jabotinsky Street, which was changed to HaRav Shach Street. Bnei Brak is one of the two poorest cities in Israel. A street in Bnei Brak was named after one of the town's founders who was a great-grandfather of murdered journalist Daniel Pearl.

Bnei Brak is home to Israel's first women-only department store, only one example of gender segregation in what is viewed as an ultra-orthodox city. Bnei Brak was home to one of the original gender segregated bus lines that Israel's courts ruled were illegal. Mehadrin bus lines are a type of bus line in Israel that mostly ran in and/or between major Haredi population centers and in which gender segregation and other rigid religious rules observed by some ultra-Orthodox Jews were applied until 2011. In these sex-segregated buses, female passengers sat in the back of the bus and entered and exited the bus through the back door if possible, while the male passengers sat in the front part of the bus and entered and exited through the front door. Additionally, tzniut (modest dress) was often required for women, playing a radio or secular music on the bus was avoided, and advertisements were censored.

The Bnei Brak municipality set up an alternative water supply, for use on Shabbat and Jewish holidays. This supply, which does not require intervention by Jews on days of rest, avoids the problems associated with Jews working on the day of rest at Mekorot, the national water company. Most of the streets are closed on Shabbat and Jewish holidays.

Bnei Brak won national attention when it lost a battle to remove the photos of women candidates from Likud election ads. Orly Erez-Likhovski, legal advisor of the Israel Religious Action Center declared it a victory for gender equality:

Notable people

Baruch Ashlag, kabbalist
Elazar Menachem Man Shach, leader of the ultra orthodox Lithuanian Jews
Avrohom Yeshaya Karelitz, worldwide posek
Chaim Kanievsky, leader of the ultra orthodox Lithuanian Jews
Simon Leviev, conman
Sesto Pals, writer
Shuli Rand, actor, writer, singer
Mary Schaps, mathematical scholar
Dovid Shmidel, rabbi
Aharon Yehuda Leib Shteinman, rabbi
Motty Steinmetz, singer
Tuvia Tenenbom, theater director and writer
Michal Waldiger, Knesset Member in the Religious Zionist Party
Ariel Ze'evi (born 1977), Olympic judoka

International relations

Twin towns – sister cities
Bnei Brak is twinned with:
 Lakewood, New Jersey, United States, since 2011

Gallery

References

Bibliography

External links

 
1924 establishments in Mandatory Palestine
Cities in Tel Aviv District
Orthodox Jewish communities
Populated places established in 1924
Religious Israeli communities